The 1st Criterium of Polish Speedway League Aces was the 1982 version of the Criterium of Polish Speedway Leagues Aces. It took place on March 28 in the Polonia Stadium in Bydgoszcz, Poland.

Starting positions draw 

 Jerzy Kochman - Śląsk Świętochłowice
 Roman Jankowski - Unia Leszno
 Andrzej Huszcza - Falubaz Zielona Góra
 Jan Ząbik - Apator Toruń
 Bolesław Proch - Polonia Bydgoszcz
 Alfred Siekierka - Kolejarz Opole
 Wojciech Żabiałowicz - Apator Toruń
 Leonard Raba - Kolejarz Opole
 Edward Jancarz - Stal Gorzów Wlkp.
 Piotr Pyszny - ROW Rybnik
 Marek Ziarnik - Polonia Bydgoszcz
 Marek Kępa - Motor Lublin
 Zenon Plech - Wybrzeże Gdańsk
 Piotr Podrzycki - Start Gniezno
 Ryszard Buśkiewicz - Unia Leszno
 Eugeniusz Błaszak - Start Gniezno
 (R1) Andrzej Maroszek - Polonia Bydgoszcz
 (R2) Ryszard Czarnecki - Stal Rzeszów

Heat details

Sources 
 Roman Lach - Polish Speedway Almanac

See also 

Criterium of Aces
1982
Criterium